Manapalli is a small village on the northern bank of the Cauvery River in the Namakkal district of Tamil Nadu, India. Over 5000 people live in this village, which includes Manapalli, GanapathiPalayam, Rasagounden Pudur, Ramanaicken Palyam, Ellaikattuputhur, Kunnipalayam, Theerthampalayam, Aruvankattur, Ganeshapuram, Chennakkal Pudur (bordering the Mohanur sugar factory), and MelaPettapalayam. The village is composed of mostly Hindus.

Temples

Beemeeswarar Temple (Manappalli)
Varadharaja Perumal Temple (Manapalli)
Chokkanayaki Amman Temple (Manappalli)
Muniyandi Temple (Manappalli)
Sri Vel Vinayakar Temple (Manappalli)
Ganapathi Vinayagar Temple (Ganapathipalayam)
Mariamman Temple (Eramanaikan Palayam)
Bhagavathi Amman Temple (Ellaikaatuputhur)
Throwbathi Amman Temple (Kunnipalayam)
Mariamman Temple (Theertham Palyam)
Vinayagar Temple (Ganeshapuram)
Kannimar Kovil (Theerthampalayam)
Vinayagarkovil (Theerthampalayam)
Muthayammal Temple (Mela Pettapalayam)
Santhiyappan Temple (Mela petapalayam)
Rajaganapathi Temple (Manappalli)

Schools
Middle school in Manappalli
Primary school in Kunnipalyam
Primary school in Theertham Palyam
Primary school in Melapettapalyam

Nearby Towns
Mohanur (east 6 km)
Velur (west 11 km)
Namakkal (north 25 km)
Tiruchirappalli (east 80 km).

Transportation
The village can be reached by bus route from Tiruchirappalli (via Musiri, Thottiam, Kattuputhur, or Mohanur), from Salem (via Namakkal or Mohanur), or from Karur (via Velur).

Health Centres
Only one government-sponsored primary health center exists in Manapalli.

Economy
Manapalli's economy is fully agricultural.

Celebrities
Late Sivasubramaniyam, son in law of Bharathidasan.
Captain Palanisamy who expired in the 1971 war.
Sivashanmugam, a famous writer, and the author of  Arththaviyal (அர்த்தவியல்).
Veeramani, the grandson of Bharathidasan, a famous astrologer.

References

 Villages in Namakkal district